Lieutenant General Joseph Henry Laye,  (4 February 1849 – 26 June 1938) was a British Army officer who served as Deputy Adjutant-General to the Forces.

Military career
Laye served in both the Ninth Xhosa War from 1877 to 1878 and the Anglo-Zulu War of 1879. He commanded the 1st Battalion Scottish Rifles from 1889 to 1893. He was a temporary assistant adjutant-general at army headquarters until February 1900, when he became Deputy Adjutant-General to the Forces, with the temporary rank of major general.

Laye was appointed a Companion of the Order of the Bath in the 1902 Coronation Honours published on 26 June 1902, and received the decoration from King Edward VII at Buckingham Palace on 24 October.

Laye died of a heart attack on 26 June 1938, aged 89.

References

1849 births
1938 deaths
British Army lieutenant generals
British Army personnel of the Anglo-Zulu War
Companions of the Order of the Bath
Commanders of the Royal Victorian Order
New Zealand military personnel